The bridge that carries Arkansas Highway 274 across Little Cypress Creek (about  from its junction with Highway 203), near Thornton, Arkansas in Calhoun County, was listed on the National Register of Historic Places in 1995. Its abutments and piers are all of wood, and the bridge deck is wood covered with asphalt.

See also
Little Cypress Creek Bridge: another bridge over the Little Cypress Creek
National Register of Historic Places listings in Calhoun County, Arkansas
List of bridges on the National Register of Historic Places in Arkansas

References

Road bridges on the National Register of Historic Places in Arkansas
Bridges completed in 1940
National Register of Historic Places in Calhoun County, Arkansas
Trestle bridges in the United States
Wooden bridges in the United States
1940 establishments in Arkansas
Transportation in Calhoun County, Arkansas